K-Razy Shoot-Out is a clone of the arcade game Berzerk developed by K-Byte, a division of Kay Enterprises, and released for the Atari 8-bit family in 1981. The game was written by Torre Meeder and Keith Dreyer, and was the first Atari 8-bit cartridge from a third-party developer. An Atari 5200 version followed in 1983. 
The team of Dreyer and Meeder also wrote the 1983 Atari 8-bit game Boulders and Bombs.

K-Razy Shoot-Out is part of a series of titles with the "K-" prefix, including K-Razy Kritters and K-Star Patrol. All of them were published on cartridge. After CBS Software purchased K-Byte, the games were published under the CBS brand, including the Atari 5200 port of K-Razy Shoot-Out.

Gameplay
As in Berzerk, the goal is to destroy all of the robots occupying a series of randomly generated mazes. In Berzerk, if the player takes too long to clear a maze, an indestructible bouncing ball ("Evil Otto") drives the player to an exit. K-Razy Shoot-Out uses a visible timer instead. If the timer runs out, the game ends. If the player exits a maze without clearing it, the player has to replay one or two mazes without getting points.

Reception
K-Razy Shoot-Out sold 35,000 copies by June 1982. John J. Anderson of Creative Computing Video & Arcade Games, wrote that as a Berzerk clone, "the only element that's missing is the speech ... lots of fun, and has a great deal of staying power". It won the 1983 Arcade Award for "Best Arcade/Action Computer Game" from Electronic Games magazine. The Berzerk similarity was mentioned, but also that the game has "a unique flavor all its own."

See also
Robot Attack
Robon
Thief

References 

1981 video games
Action video games
Atari 5200 games
Atari 8-bit family games
Multidirectional shooters
Video game clones
Video games developed in the United States
CBS Software games